Emma Louise Barton (born 26 July 1977) is an English actress. She is perhaps best known for the role of Honey Mitchell in EastEnders which she has portrayed on and off since November 2005. Before her role in EastEnders, Barton appeared in Spooks and on stage in plays including Grease. In 2019, Barton competed in the seventeenth series of Strictly Come Dancing, paired with professional Anton du Beke, reaching the Grand Final.

Early life
Barton attended Horndean Community School in Hampshire from 1989 to 1993, and then trained at the Guildford School of Acting, graduating in 1998.

Career
Barton joined the cast of EastEnders as Honey in November 2005 and played the role until September 2008 when the character was one of several written out by executive producer Diederick Santer that year. Following a brief return in 2014, it was announced on 6 September 2015 that Barton would return to the role permanently in November that year.

On 14 November 2008, Barton sang live for Children in Need in the BBC studios in London. She starred in the title role of Snow White in the Marlowe Theatre's Canterbury pantomime from December 2008 – January 2009 alongside Stephen Mulhern. From March to November 2009 she was touring the UK in the stage production of Chicago, alongside Jimmy Osmond and Twinnie Lee Moore, playing Roxie Hart.

In June 2009, Barton opened two BreastHealth UK clinics in the Birmingham area.

In December 2009, Barton played the part of Jack in Jack and the Beanstalk at Devonshire Park Theatre in Eastbourne. In May 2014, Barton became an Ambassador for Locksheath Pumas Rugby Club in Fareham, Hampshire. Also in May 2014, Barton reprised her role as Honey in EastEnders for a short stint. In June 2014 she was a contestant in Celebrity Masterchef.

During 2014, Barton played Dolly in the National Theatre's touring production of One Man, Two Guvnors.

During the 2016–17 Christmas pantomime season, Barton played the role of Tinkerbell in the Crawley Hawth Theatre pantomime production of Peter Pan alongside Shaun Williamson as Captain Hook and Richard David-Caine and Joseph Elliott (from CBeebies Swashbuckle) as pirates on Captain Hook's ship.

Strictly Come Dancing 
From September 2019 Barton competed in the seventeenth series of Strictly Come Dancing, paired with professional Anton du Beke, reaching the grand final.

Personal life
From 2002 to 2005, Barton was married to lawyer Nigel Stoat. She has five dogs.

In January 2019, it was announced that she would be running the London Marathon with other  EastEnders cast members for a Dementia campaign in honour of Barbara Windsor.

References

External links

Emma Barton EastEnders bio at BBC

1977 births
Alumni of the Guildford School of Acting
English soap opera actresses
Living people
English stage actresses
Actresses from Portsmouth